Rosa Márquez Baena (born 22 December 2000) is a Spanish professional footballer who plays as a midfielder for Liga F club Real Betis and the Spain women's national team.

Club career
Márquez joined the academy of Real Betis at the age of 11. She has captained the club on occasion. In June 2020, it was announced that she signed a new contract with Betis, committing herself to the club until 2023.

International career
Márquez made her debut for the national team on 15 June 2021, coming on as a substitute for Alexia Putellas against Denmark. She became the first player from Real Betis' academy to play for the Spain national team and the third Real Betis player overall to represent them.

Personal life
Outside of football, Márquez studies physical therapy. She cites Andrés Iniesta as an influence both inside and outside of her footballing career.

Career statistics

International
.

References

External links
 Profile at BDFutbol

2000 births
Living people
People from Aljarafe
Sportspeople from the Province of Seville
Footballers from Andalusia
Spanish women's footballers
Women's association football midfielders
Real Betis Féminas players
Primera División (women) players
Spain women's youth international footballers
Spain women's international footballers
21st-century Spanish women